Miss Philippines Earth 2019 was the 19th edition of the Miss Philippines Earth pageant. It was held at The Cove in Okada Manila, Parañaque, Philippines on July 10, 2019. It is the first time that the pageant was held on a weekday, and in the afternoon. The pageant reverted back to its original name "Miss Philippines Earth" after being held last year under the name "Miss Earth Philippines".

At the end of the event, Zahra Bianca Saldua, Miss Philippines-Air 2018, crowned Janelle Tee of Pasig City as Miss Philippines Earth 2019. With her crowned are the court of elemental queens: Ana Monica Tan was named Miss Philippines Air, Chelsea Fernandez was named Miss Philippines Water, Alexandra Dayrit was named Miss Philippines Fire, and Karen Nicole Piccio was named Miss Philippines Eco Tourism 2021. Celeste Cortesi, Miss Philippines Earth 2018, could not attend the coronation due to a skin allergy and was advised not to attend the event.

Results
  The contestant was a Semi-Finalist/Finalist in an International pageant.

Special awards

Preliminary Rounds

Pre-Pageant Events

Talent Competition 

 The 10 HANA Beauties  (06.24.19) with Miss HANA Beauty going to Romblon, Romblon (07.10.19)

 The 10 Connext Advocates  (06.28.19) with Miss Connext Holdings going to Pasig (07.10.19)

Special Sponsor Awards

Delegates
40 contestants representing various cities, municipalities, provinces, and communities abroad will compete for the title.

Judges 
The following served as a judge on the conclusion of Miss Earth Philippines 2019:
 Arnel Papa - International jewelry designer
 Michelle Tañada - Founder Miss Earth Foundation, CMO ActiveAsia
 Jeffrey de la Paz - HR Manager of Diamond Hotel
 Paolo Castro - Head of Communications, Connext Holdings
 Ricky Reyes - CEO of Gandang Ricky Reyes 
 Lorraine Schuck - Executive VP of Carousel Productions
 Harvey Ong - CEO Alfa Mart
 Margot Chua - CEO HANA Cosmetics
 Christine Jacobs-Sandejas - TV Host/CNN News Anchor

References

External links
 Miss Philippines Earth website

2019
2019 beauty pageants
2019 in the Philippines